El Economista is a Mexican business and economics newspaper. Founded in 1988, it publishes from Monday to Friday in five columns. One of its most distinctive features is the unusual tone of pink-orange paper it is printed on.

Contents 

Recently, El Economista has tried to renew itself. It now includes several add-ins such as monthly or weekly supplements covering important business and personal finance issues like: Mutual Funds, Real Estate, Entrepreneurship, Health, Fashion, Construction and Transport.

From Monday to Friday the newspaper prints an Editorial Column, From Europe, a digest of The New York Times, La Plaza (sports, showbiz and cultural section), the usual Market Information, a Personal Finance section, Small Businesses, a Column by an academic of respected business schools (ITAM, ITESM, IPADE, Universidad Anáhuac, and so on) Finance, Economics, National Politics and Local Politics. Finally, the editorial page.

Some of the editorialists include Ricardo Medina, Maricarmen Cortés, Luis Mercado and Isaac Katz.

See also
 List of newspapers in Mexico

References

External links
 El Economista

1989 establishments in Mexico
Newspapers published in Mexico
Business newspapers
Newspapers established in 1989
Spanish-language newspapers
Business in Mexico